Shameen Khan is a Pakistani actress. She appeared in Pakistani television serials. In 2019, she made her film debut with Shamoon Abbasi's Gumm. She appeared in television series such as Gohar-e-Nayab, Hina Ki Khushboo, Dharkan, Bharosa Pyar Tera and Khuda Aur Muhabbat 3.

Filmography

Film
2019: Gumm: In the Middle of Nowhere

Television

References

External links

21st-century Pakistani actresses
Living people
Pakistani film actresses
Pakistani television actresses
1994 births